Castro of Porto de Baixo is an archeological site located within the Dunes of Corrubedo Natural Park in Galicia, Spain. It was inhabited between the 4th century BC and 2nd century BC.

References

Archaeological sites in Galicia (Spain)
Buildings and structures in the Province of A Coruña